Chushevitsy is a rural locality (a selo) and the administrative center of Chushevitskoye Rural Settlement, Verkhovazhsky District, Vologda Oblast, Russia. The population was 735 as of 2002. There are 18 streets.

Geography 
Chushevitsy is located 42 km southwest of Verkhovazhye (the district's administrative centre) by road. Shchekino is the nearest rural locality.

References 

Rural localities in Verkhovazhsky District